Code page 921 (CCSID 921) (also known as CP 921, IBM 00921) is a code page used under IBM AIX and DOS to write the Estonian, Latvian, and Lithuanian languages. It is an extension of ISO/IEC 8859-13.

Code page 901 (CCSID 901) replaces the currency sign (¤) at position 0xA4 with the euro sign (€).

Code page layout
In the following table characters are shown together with their corresponding Unicode code points.

References

921
ISO/IEC 8859
921